NGC 1637 is an isolated, non-interacting intermediate spiral galaxy in the constellation Eridanus, about a degree to the WNW of the star Mu Eridani. The galaxy is inclined at an angle of 31.1° to the line of sight from the Earth and the long axis is oriented along a position angle of 16.3°.

In 1991, Gérard de Vaucouleurs and associates assigned a morphological classification of SAB(rs)c to NGC 1637, indicating a spiral galaxy with a weak bar structure (SAB) across the nucleus, surrounded by a partial ring (rs) and somewhat loosely-wound arms (c). While the inner section of the galaxy shows a symmetrical two-arm structure, it has a single outer spiral arm that wraps 180° around the nucleus, giving the galaxy an overall asymmetric, lopsided appearance. The outer spiral arm has a red component that indicates a significant age. However, the existence of this structure is difficult to explain. The galaxy shows indications of recent starburst activity that may have terminated around 15 million years ago.

The active central nucleus shows weak LINER behavior, and it may be an intermediate form between a LINER and an H II region.

It received the designation SN 1999em and was the brightest supernova discovered that year, reaching magnitude 13.1.

References

External links 
 

Intermediate spiral galaxies
LINER galaxies
Eridanus (constellation)
1637
15821
Articles containing video clips